Cayo Guajaba is a cay on the northern coast of Cuba, in the province of Camagüey.

Geography
It is part of Jardines del Rey archipelago, and is located west of Cayo Sabinal, east of Cayo Romano, north of The Bay of la Gloria (Bahia de la Gloria) and borders the Atlantic Ocean to the north.

The island is administered as part of Nuevitas municipality.

References

Nuevitas
Guajaba
Geography of Camagüey Province